Astone UMPC is a mini notebook manufactured by Astone and based in VIA NanoBook. It has a  LCD touch screen powered by a 1.2 GHz VIA C7-M processor. The module bay on the right side of the screen allows expansion with optional components such as webcam, GPS receiver, or world clock.

Specifications
The hardware specification of the Astone UMPC are as follows: 

 Processor: VIA C7-M ULV 1.2Ghz (FSB400)
 Graphics: integrated VX700
 Audio: VT1708A, with 2 internal 1.5W built-in speaker
 Monitor: 7″ LCD Touch Screen WVGA 800×480
 LAN: 10/100 Mbit/s LAN
 Wireless LAN: 802.11b/g
 Battery: 4-cell 2200mAh
 I/O: DVi-I, USB, Microphone, Headphone out/Line-out, RJ45
 Webcam: 0.3MP Camera
 Card Reader: 4-in-1 (SD, MMC, MS, MS Pro)
 Dimension: 230 x 171 x 29.4 mm
 Weight: 0.97 kg
 Memory: 1 GB DDR 667
 HDD: 60GB (1.8″ HDD)

References

Subnotebooks